Malacoctenus costaricanus is a species of labrisomid blenny only known from the Pacific coast of Costa Rica and El Salvador.

References

costaricanus
Western Central American coastal fauna
Fish described in 1959
Taxa named by Victor G. Springer